Necrodini is a tribe of carrion beetles in the subfamily Silphinae. It contains two genera - Necrodes and Diamesus.

References

Silphidae
Polyphaga tribes